Andrew Martin (born 6 July 1962) is an English novelist, documentary maker, journalist and musician.

Martin was brought up in Yorkshire, studied at Merton College, Oxford and qualified as a barrister. He has since worked as a freelance journalist for a number of publications while writing novels, starting with Bilton, a comic novel about journalists, and The Bobby Dazzlers, a comic novel set in the North of England, for which he was named Spectator Young Writer of the Year.

The Guardian claimed Bilton and The Bobby Dazzlers "rank high in the lists of the best comic novels published in the past 10 years".

His series of detective novels about Jim Stringer, a railwayman reassigned to the North Eastern Railway police in Edwardian England, includes The Necropolis Railway (set on the real London Necropolis Railway), The Blackpool Highflyer, The Lost Luggage Porter, Murder at Deviation Junction, Death on a Branch Line, The Last Train to Scarborough, The Somme Stations (Winner of the CWA Ellis Peters Historical Award 2011) and The Baghdad Railway Club.

In 2015, he released The Yellow Diamond, A Crime of the Super-Rich, a detective novel set in London's Mayfair. In summer 2017, he released 'Soot' an acclaimed crime novel set in 18th century York.

He has also written a number of works of non-fiction. Railway-related titles include Underground Overground, A Passenger's History of the Tube; Belles and Whistles, Five Journeys Through Time on Britain's Trains and Night Trains, The Rise and Fall of the Sleeper.

Other non-fiction works include How to Get Things Really Flat; Ghoul Britannia and Flight by Elephant about Gyles Mackrell and his Burmese, elephant-assisted wartime rescue mission, published in 2013.

In addition, he is the editor of a dictionary of humorous quotations: Funny You Should Say That: A Compendium of Jokes, Quips and Quotations from Cicero to the Simpsons.

His works for television and radio include: Between the Lines, Railways in Fiction and Film (2008), Disappearing Dad, Fathers in Literature (2010), The Trains that Time Forgot: Britain's Lost Railway Journeys (2015), all in the Timeshift series, and three essay series for Radio 3, The Sound and The Fury (2013), England Ejects (2014), The Further Realm (2015). He also writes short stories for the Calm app.

Andrew writes and performs music under the name Brunswick Green.

Andrew Martin lives in north London with his wife and sons.

Bibliography 

Bilton. Faber & Faber. 1999. .
The Bobby Dazzlers. Faber & Faber. 2002. .
The Yellow Diamond, Faber & Faber, 2015. 
 Soot, Corsair, 2017
 The Martian Girl, Corsair, 2018
 The Winker, Corsair, 2019
Jim Stringer, Steam Detective, novels
The Necropolis Railway. Faber & Faber. 2002. .
The Blackpool Highflyer. Faber & Faber. 2005. .
The Lost Luggage Porter. Faber & Faber. 2007. .
Murder at Deviation Junction. Faber & Faber. 2008. .
Death on a Branch Line. Faber & Faber. 2008. .
The Last Train to Scarborough. Faber & Faber. 2009. .
The Somme Stations. Faber & Faber. 2011. .
The Baghdad Railway Club. Faber & Faber. 2012. .
Night Train to Jamalpur. Faber & Faber. 2014. .
 'Powder Smoke' (Jim Stringer Book 10), Corsair, 2021 (ISBN 1472154835)

Non-fiction
How to Get Things Really Flat: A Man's Guide to Ironing, Dusting and Other Household Arts. Short Books. 2008. 
Funny You Should Say That: A Compendium of Jokes, Quips and Quotations from Cicero to the Simpsons. Penguin 2006. . 
Ghoul Britannia, Notes on a Haunted Island. Short Books. 2009. 
Underground, Overground: A Passenger's History of the Tube.  Profile Books. 2012.  
Flight by Elephant, World War II's most Daring Jungle Mission.  Fourth Estate. 2013. 
Belles & Whistles, Five Journeys Through Time on Britain's Trains. Profile Books, 2014. .
 Night Trains, The Rise and Fall of the Sleeper, Profile Books, 2017 
 Seats of London: A Field Guide to London Transport Moquette Patterns, Safe Haven Books, 2019 
 Steam Trains Today: Journeys Along Britain's Heritage Railways, Profile Books, 2021 (ISBN 1788161440)

References

External links 
 Review of The Lost Luggage Porter
 2011 Interview Shotsmag Ezine "The Railway Detective Goes to War"
 Review of The Somme Stations in Shotsmag Ezine

1962 births
Living people
21st-century English novelists
English crime fiction writers
English editors
English male journalists
Alumni of Merton College, Oxford
People from York
English male novelists
21st-century English male writers
Writers from Yorkshire